The 96th Infantry Regiment (96e régiment d’infanterie) was a French infantry regiment. Like all the French infantry regiments numbered 76 to 99, it inherited the traditions of two regiments - in the case of the 96th, these were the 96th Infantry Regiment and the 21st Light Infantry Regiment.

The 96th Infantry Regiment was initially raised on 1 November 1745 by prince William of Nassau-Saarbruck, who had already also raised and paid for a cavalry regiment. It was initially called the 'régiment de Nassau-Saarbrück'. It was given the numeral 96 by an ordinance of 1 January 1791. It was known as both a demi-brigade and a regiment during the French Revolutionary Wars and the Napoleonic Wars before being disbanded in September 1815. (A 21st Light Infantry Regiment - initially known as a battalion then a demi-brigade - was raised on 21 August 1792 and disbanded in 1814.)

The 21st Light Infantry Regiment was initially raised on 6 September 1815 as the 'légion royale étrangère' (royal foreign legion), changing its name in 1816 to the légion de Hohenlohe then the régiment de Hohenlohe before being disbanded on 5 January 1831 and replaced with the 21st Light Infantry Regiment. This was re-numbered as the 96th in 1855. Guillaume Apollinaire was fighting in it as a sous-lieutenant when he was wounded in 1915.

Bibliography
Recueil d'historiques de l'Infanterie française (Général Andolenko - Eurimprim 1969)

Infantry regiments of France